The canton of Rebais is a French former administrative division, located in the arrondissement of Provins, in the Seine-et-Marne département (Île-de-France région). It was disbanded following the French canton reorganisation which came into effect in March 2015. It consisted of 18 communes, which joined the canton of Coulommiers in 2015.

Demographics

Composition 
The canton of Rebais was composed of 18 communes:

Bellot
Boitron
Chauffry
Doue
Hondevilliers
Montdauphin
Montenils
Orly-sur-Morin
Rebais
Sablonnières
Saint-Cyr-sur-Morin
Saint-Denis-lès-Rebais
Saint-Germain-sous-Doue
Saint-Léger
Saint-Ouen-sur-Morin
La Trétoire
Verdelot
Villeneuve-sur-Bellot

See also
Cantons of the Seine-et-Marne department
Communes of the Seine-et-Marne department

References

Rebais
2015 disestablishments in France
States and territories disestablished in 2015